Mal Connor is an Australian former professional rugby league footballer in the New South Wales Rugby League (NSWRL) premiership.

Connor played for the Eastern Suburbs club in the years 1976 and 1977 as well as 1979 to 1980. A , Connor played in the Easts side that defeated St George Dragons in the final of the 1977 mid-week cup competition.

References
 

Year of birth missing (living people)
Living people
Australian rugby league players
Sydney Roosters players
Rugby league hookers
Place of birth missing (living people)